Gilchrist House may refer to:

 Gilchrist House (Cordova, Alabama)
A. C. Freeman House, Punta Gorda, Florida, known also as Gilchrist House
 Stevens-Gilchrist House, Sarasota, Florida
 Werner-Gilchrist House, Albuquerque, New Mexico
 Capt. Gilchrist House, Vermilion, Ohio, listed on the National Register of Historic Places in Erie County, Ohio
 Capt. Gilchrist Sr. House, Vermilion, Ohio, listed on the National Register of Historic Places in Erie County, Ohio